is a temple of the Shingon school of Buddhism, located in the city of Uda, Nara Prefecture, Japan.

According to legend and myth, the temple was first opened by En no Gyōja in 681, rendered west entrance to Murō-ji by Kūkai in 824, then later became known with its current name.

Overview
The sculpture was ordered by abdicated Emperor Go-Toba, in response to monk  of Kōfuku-ji. A mason from Song is believed to have done the sculpture between 1207 and 1209. Other treasures held by the temple include the wooden Jizō bodhisattva image (Important Cultural Property).

See also 
 For an explanation of terms concerning Japanese Buddhism, Japanese Buddhist art, and Japanese Buddhist temple architecture, see the Glossary of Japanese Buddhism.

References

 

Buddhist temples in Nara Prefecture
Historic Sites of Japan
En no Gyōja
Uda, Nara